The Lausanne Métro (French: Métro de Lausanne) system is a two-line urban rail transport system in Lausanne, Vaud, Switzerland. Around a quarter of the system has been used for urban rail transport since 1877, when the route between the city centre and Ouchy opened as Switzerland's first public funicular railway. The network is owned by two distinct companies and operated by a third.

Of the operating lines, only line M2 can be considered a true, grade-separated rapid transit line. It is a fully automated, rubber-tyred metro line based on the technology of the Paris Métro and opened on 27 October 2008. Line M1, however, is considered light rail albeit being underground for a short section in the city centre.

Upon the opening of Line M2, Lausanne replaced Rennes, France as the smallest city in the world to have a full metro system. A third line (Line M3) is now planned, based on the same rubber-tyred metro technology as Line M2.

History 

The Lausanne-Ouchy railway, the precursor to the M2 Line of the Lausanne Métro, was inaugurated in 1877 as a funicular. In 1959 the first overhaul took place by transforming the funicular into a rack railway under the name "métro". At that time, Flon and Gare CFF stations were demolished and replaced by concrete underground equivalents. The line was however always nicknamed La Ficelle (literal translation: "The String") by its users due to its funicular past and circulation above ground in the greenery for more than half of its run.

Connected to the Flon facilities, the freight trains from the main station to the storage area of the harbour (in Flon) travelled on this line until the construction of a direct connection between the freight station of Sébeillon and the Flon Valley in 1954.

The line was finally closed to all traffic on 21 January 2006. The rolling stock was originally sold to the French city of Villard-de-Lans which planned the construction in 2008 of its own rack railway, La Patache, to ensure a link between the centre of Villard and Le Balcon de Villard.

A bus service was put into operation to replace the then-closed "La Ficelle" until the opening of the new metro M2 Line. This service was called Métrobus (MB): the south loop linked Ouchy to the CFF station and the north loop linked the station to Montbenon (which is located right above the Flon area).

Current service

Line M1

Line M2 

Construction work (including enabling works) took around 4 years, and brought significant rebuilds of all former Métro Lausanne-Ouchy stations, plus involved moving the platforms at Lausanne-Flon station a short distance further north to give Cross-platform interchange from northbound M2 to the Lausanne-Echallens-Bercher railway. The new line opened in autumn 2008.

Technical 
The line is not entirely underground, but the majority (70-90%) of the system is in tunnel. The line is steeply sloped, with an average incline of 5.7% and as steep as 12% in some places. A rubber-tyred metro was selected to counter these, the steepest slopes of any similar adhesion-worked system in the world. The constraints in braking distance and deceleration are such that the M2 can travel faster upwards than downwards.

There are 14 stations on the line, which makes a   vertical gain. An additional  of track is contained within the depot at Vennes, along with the signalling, security and information facilities.

The line is entirely automated, managed from a central command station. This means that it is cheaper to operate than a traditional system with drivers, and more flexible during peak hours. The stations are equipped with platform screen doors and dedicated station personnel are on hand to assist passengers. In contrast with line 1, trains also run on a totally separate right-of-way, meaning there is no conflict between the surface traffic and the metro, enhancing safety and reliability compared to a tramway. All new sections of the route were built as double track, plus the reused Lausanne-Ouchy alignment was also rebuilt as double-track, with the exception of the tunnel under the CFF station due to high costs. This leads to increased capacity and less potential for knock-on delays.

Performance 
The line opened in 2008 with a designed capacity of 25 million passengers/year, but exceeded this with 27.6 million by 2013, and 28 million in 2014. As of February 2015, overcrowding is now a significant problem, and the state has granted significant funds towards a programme which will improve capacity by running extra trains and building additional tracks. Patronage has continued to rise, with 31.5 million passengers carried in 2018.

Trains travel up to every 3 minutes between the main railway station and Sallaz, with trains every 6 minutes along the rest of the line. The trains travel with a top service speed of  top speed, taking 18 minutes to travel the full length of the line. The line was designed for up to 6,600 passengers/hour in each direction.

Stations 
The underground stations are located as close as possible to the surface. They are equipped with stairs, lifts and facilities for handicapped people. The Lausanne slopes have been used to create multi-level access, make ramp access easier and take advantage of natural light as much as possible.

Rolling stock 

Articulated vehicles with 4 powered bogies.
15 two-car trainsets.
222 passengers, 62 seated.
Rubber-tyred metro with lateral guidance based on the MP 89 from Paris Métro.
Fully automated (CBTC Alstom Urbalis 300).

Technical data of the trains 
Length of a train : 
Length of a car : 
Width of a car : 
Height of the car to ground level: 
Mass of an empty train : 
Mass of a train at maximum load (4 p/m2) :  (1)
Width of the access doors : 
Height of the access doors : 

Capacity of the trains

Delivery of the trains 
The first train was delivered to Lausanne on 2 March 2006 and all the other trains were delivered at a rate of two per month. When they arrived, the trains were stored in the CFF storage of Lausanne. Once the métro's depot had been completed, the vehicles were moved to the Vennes facility by the Autumn of 2006.

With the line having been over its design capacity for at least 2 years, the state granted funds for 3 additional metro trainsets in February 2015. The vehicles are being built in Valenciennes by Alstom, who also built the original fleet, and are designed to be identical to the existing rolling stock. The new vehicles, which are due to arrive in Lausanne by mid-2017, are an interim solution to raise capacity on the central section of the line. Capacity between Lausanne-gare and Sallaz stations will rise from 5,600 passengers per hour (each way) to 7,000 passengers per hour (each way) when they enter service in the last 3 months of 2017. The longer-term plan, for which funding is now also in place, involves a new double-track tunnel under the railway station.

Accidents 
On 23 February 2005, part of the tunnel under construction collapsed under the Saint-Laurent square in the centre of Lausanne. More than 500 m3 of debris (water and earth) fell into the tunnel, forming a huge fifteen metre gap. The area was completely evacuated for a few days and consolidation and geological analysis work started. A large pocket of water had not been noticed during the initial explorations.

Repair work lasted for a few months. The incident fortunately had no major consequence; nobody was in the area of the collapse which had heavily damaged a shopping mall. Part of the budget had been allocated for such risks and the deadline for the construction in December 2008 was not directly affected.

On 27 October 2006, a construction worker died from injuries. He had fallen a few days before on the construction site at the level of the entrance of the University Hospital of Lausanne (CHUV).

On 28 July 2008 a high level manager for Alstom who had responsibility for the security system for the new lines was found hanging in the stairwell at the entrance to the Vennes station of the M2. The 45-year-old French man's death appeared to have been a suicide.

Extensions and development

New Lausanne-Gare section 
The state has granted funds for major development of the Métro system, with plans in place for improvement work until 2025. Development on the M2 line will also provide for the future of a line 3. Capacity improvement is currently limited to the central and northern sections of the line, because the tunnel under the main railway station is only single-track. Funding is now in place to build a new double-track tunnel under the railway station, and relocate the métro station closer to the main-line platforms. This will mean extra capacity is available on the whole line, and will leave the original tunnel and 2006 station available for the planned line 3. As of October 2019, a further public scrutiny project is underway, and work to build the new tunnel and platforms is due to start in 2022, with the new route expected to be operational in 2027.

Northward extension 
The end station Les Croisettes has been designed to allow a future extension of the line to the north towards Epalinges-Village, or even Le Chalet-à-Gobet.

Future service

Line M3 
A Line M3 is proposed to serve the new development area of La Blécherette and the west of Lausanne (Malley, Renens Bussigny). Line M3 is planned to use metro technology compatible with the M2 and would be in correspondence with M1, M2 and LEB railway at the station Lausanne-Flon. The press theorised that the M3 could take over the M2 line from Ouchy to Lausanne Gare and a new terminus for the M2 would be established. However, this issue has subsequently been clarified: while new platforms will be built at Lausanne Gare, a second tunnel will be constructed from there to Grancy, underneath the main railway station. Under these proposals, both lines 2 and 3 will share the physical track onwards to Ouchy. This additional tunnel would bring the immediate benefit of allowing more frequent métro services to the railway station. The proposals were put to a referendum in February 2014, and having won public approval in the vote, work on the new line was projected to start in 2018, and a managerial position for the project has been advertised.

In 2014, it was reported that the first stage of construction would be between Lausanne-Chauderon station, Lausanne-Gare and Ouchy, as a total of 47 million francs have been given to the project by the Federal Council.  It is expected the second phase of work, between Chauderon and La Blécherette, will cost a further 72 million francs. Public inquiries into the first construction project have now opened, covering the initial stretch to reroute line 2 between Grancy and the current Lausanne-Gare platforms.

Network map

See also 

 Trolleybuses in Lausanne
Public transport in the Lausanne Region

Notes and references

External links 
 Transports Lausannois (TL) 
 Lausanne Metro at UrbanRail.net 
 Lausanne Métro at public-transport.net 
 Lausanne Metro Map at metrolinemap.com 
 Une petite recherche sur la compagnie du Lausanne-Ouchy et la gare de Sébeillon, par Julien Sansonnens 
 LO - Métro Lausanne-Ouchy (Photos) 
 galerie Photos-Trains.ch (photos) 

Lausanne Metro
Rapid transit in Switzerland
Metro
Underground rapid transit in Switzerland
750 V DC railway electrification